Thampi Kannanthanam (11 December 1953 – 2 October 2018) was an Indian film director, screenwriter, producer and actor, who worked in Malayalam cinema. He has directed 16 films.

Personal life
Thampi was born on 11 December 1953 as the sixth son of Baby Kannanthanam and Thankamma at Kanjirappally, Kottayam. He studied in MT Seminary School and at St. Dominic's College. He began his film career as an assistant director. Thampi was married to Kunjumol and the couple have two childrenAiswarya and Angel.

Career
He debuted as a director in 1983 with the film Thavalam. He has also acted in Itha Oru Theeram (1980), Attimari (1981), Madrasile Mon (1982), Thudarkatha (1991). He was most active during the period 1980–90. His most notable directorial films include Rajavinte Makan, Vazhiyorakazchakal, Bhoomiyile Rajakkanmar, Indrajaalam, Naadody, Chukkan, and Maanthrikam.

Death 
Thampi was admitted to a private hospital in Kochi following various ailments. His health condition worsened further and he died on 2 October 2018. He is survived by his wife Kunjumol, daughters Aiswarya and Angel.

Filmography

References

External links 
 

Malayalam film directors
1953 births
2018 deaths
Malayalam film producers
Male actors in Malayalam cinema
Malayalam screenwriters
Screenwriters from Kerala
Film producers from Kerala
Film directors from Kerala
20th-century Indian male actors
Male actors from Kerala
20th-century Indian film directors
21st-century Indian film directors